Petricci is a village in Tuscany, central Italy, administratively a frazione of the comune of Semproniano, province of Grosseto. At the time of the 2001 census its population amounted to 168.

Petricci is about 55 km from Grosseto and 5 km from Semproniano. The village was founded in 1785 and it is divided into four borgate (hamlets): Il Crognolo, La Croce, La Macina and La Piana.

Main sights 
 Church of San Giuseppe (18th century), it is the main parish church of the village. The bell tower was built in 1881 and completed in 1925.
 Convent of San Giusto, situated outside the village, it's now in ruins.

References

Bibliography 
 Bruno Santi, Guida storico-artistica alla Maremma. Itinerari culturali nella provincia di Grosseto, Siena, Nuova Immagine, 1995, p. 244.
 Ippolito Corridori, Lorenzo Galeazzi, Petricci: un popolo, un territorio, 200 anni di storia, Siena, Il Leccio, 2006.
 Claudia Cinquemani Dragoni, Petricci, nel ruvido incanto di un paese di pietra, oltre gli occhi del Guardiano, in "Le Antiche Dogane", Montemerano, Aldo Sara Editore, April 2010.

See also 
 Catabbio
 Cellena
 Rocchette di Fazio
 Semproniano

Frazioni of Semproniano